Rosh Hanikra (lit. Head of the Grottoes) may refer to:

 Rosh HaNikra grottoes, a geographic feature in Israel; article contains the main history section regarding the cape and the Ladder of Tyre
 Rosh HaNikra (kibbutz), a kibbutz nearby
 Rosh HaNikra Crossing, a border crossing between Israel and Lebanon
 Rosh HaNikra Islands, c. 800 m offshore from the cape with the grottoes